Scourged Flesh is a Christian metal band that originated in Perth, Western Australia.

Background
The band started in 2006 with brothers Todd (Guitar, Vocals) and Dave Kilgallon (Drums). Scourged Flesh added on Bassist Simon Bracegirdle as an official member. The band was later joined, after the recording of their first two albums, Released From Damnation and Bury the Lies, the band added Guitarist Daniel Holmes and Bassist Simon Hoggett. In 2008, Dave Kilgallon joined the fellow Australian band Mortification as their drummer.

Members

Current
 Todd Kilgallon – Vocals, Guitars (2006–present)
 Daniel Holmes – Guitars (2008–present)
 Simon Hoggett – Bass (2008–present)
 Dave Kilgallon – Drums (2006–present)

Former
 Simon Bracegirdle – Bass (2006–2007)
 Scott Lockyer – Bass (2007–2008)

Timeline

Discography
Studio albums
 Released From Damnation (2006)
 Bury the Lies (2007)
 Welcome to the End of the World (2009)

References

Australian Christian metal musical groups
Musical groups established in 2006
Rowe Productions artists